Vladyslav Vyacheslavovych Alekseyev (born 29 April 1998) is a Ukrainian football forward.

Club career
He made his Ukrainian First League debut for FC Dynamo-2 Kyiv on 26 March 2016 in a game against FC Naftovyk-Ukrnafta Okhtyrka.

References

External links
 

1998 births
Footballers from Nizhyn
Living people
Ukrainian footballers
Ukraine youth international footballers
Association football forwards
FC Dynamo-2 Kyiv players
FC Arsenal Kyiv players
Ukrainian Premier League players
Ukrainian First League players
Kharkiv State College of Physical Culture 1 alumni